193rd may refer to:

193rd Battalion (Nova Scotia Highlanders), CEF, a unit in the Canadian Expeditionary Force during the First World War
193rd Infantry Brigade (United States), ordered to active military service and organized at Camp Swift, Texas in February 1943
193rd Rifle Division (Soviet Union), a Red Army infantry division that was reorganised after World War II
193rd Special Operations Squadron, a unit of the Pennsylvania Air National Guard that flies the EC-130J Commando Solo

See also
193 (number)
193, the year 193 (CXCIII) of the Julian calendar